Elaine Delmar (born 13 September 1939) is a British singer and actress, with a long career in stage acting, music recording and concert performances. Born in the English town of Harpenden, she is the daughter of Jamaican-born jazz trumpeter Leslie "Jiver" Hutchinson. After learning the piano as a child, including a performance on BBC Radio, Delmar became a singer and toured with her father's band from the age of sixteen.

In 1952/1953, she appeared in Finian's Rainbow in Liverpool. She sang with Coleridge Goode's group 'The Dominoes' for a month in Germany in the mid-1950s, before going solo. She performed in clubs and on overseas tours. She appeared in the Ken Russell film Mahler (1974).

Early life 
Elaine Delmar was born on 1 September 1939 in Harpenden, in the English county of Hertfordshire. Her parents were father Jiver Hutchinson, a jazz trumpeter born in Jamaica, and mother Phyllis, both of whom moved to the UK in the 1930s. She spent her childhood with her younger brother and sister living in North London, where she attended the Trinity Grammar School in Wood Green (now known as Woodside High School. Elaine began learning the piano when she was six, going on to play the instrument on the radio during the BBC's Children's Hour when she was thirteen. She began touring with her father at the age of sixteen, singing with his band at performances in venues such as US Air Force bases. Delmar was on tour with him when he was killed in a road accident in 1959.

Career

Singer
Delmar's professional singing career began in the mid-1950s when she was selected by bassist Coleridge Goode and Lauderic Caton to sing with their quartet, The Dominoes. She spent a month with them at the Club Ecstase in Bad Harzburg, Germany. Goode later said in his autobiography that "I think it's fair to say that we started off her career". Delmar left the Dominoes after her spell with them in Germany and launched a solo career, including playing at clubs and carrying out overseas tours.

In 2010, she featured in concert with Wynton Marsalis's Lincoln Center Jazz Orchestra.

Acting
Delmar made her first stage appearance in the late 1950s when she was cast in the play Finian's Rainbow in a revival production in Liverpool. She then joined the cast of the Richard Rodgers musical drama No Strings in London's West End, as an understudy for Beverly Todd. In 1972 she was part of the original London cast of the musical Cowardy Custard at the Mermaid Theatre, which was based on the songs of Noël Coward. In 1977 she took on her biggest stage position, a starring role in Bubbling Brown Sugar, and then went on to appear in both the London and Broadway versions of Jerome Kern in Hollywood. Another role, in which she was casts purely as an actress, was A Map Of The World at the Royal National Theatre. She was cast as the Bohemian Princess in the Ken Russell film Mahler.

Personal life 
As of 2009, Delmar was living in the north London suburb of Hadley Wood.

Discography
 A Swinging Chick
 But Beautiful
 Elaine Delmar and Friends
 Nobody Else But Me
 S'Wonderful

Theatre appearances
 Finian's Rainbow (1952/1953)
 No Strings (1961)... at Her Majesty's Theatre
 Cowardy Custard (1972)... at the Mermaid Theatre
 Bubbling Brown Sugar (1977)... at the Royalty Theatre
 Map of the World... at the Royal National Theatre
 Jerome Kern in Hollywood... in London and New York

References

External links
 Elaine Delmar official website

1939 births
Living people
People from Hadley Wood
People from Harpenden
English women singers
English jazz singers
Musicians from Hertfordshire
British women jazz singers